is a Japanese voice actor archer who competed in two Olympic Games.

Career 

Sato finished 14th in the women's individual event at the 1976 Summer Olympics
with a score of 2308 points. She came tenth in the women's individual event at the 1984 Summer Olympics with a score of 2481 points.

References

External links 

 Profile on worldarchery.org

1955 births
Living people
Japanese female archers
Olympic archers of Japan
Archers at the 1976 Summer Olympics
Archers at the 1984 Summer Olympics
20th-century Japanese women